Voortman Cookies Limited is a Canadian company specializing in the production and sale of cookies.  Based in Burlington, Ontario, Voortman brand cookies are sold at retail locations across Canada, the United States, Puerto Rico, and over 70 other countries worldwide.

History  

Voortman Cookies Limited was founded in 1951 by Dutch immigrant brothers William and Harry Voortman. In the 2010s, Voortman Cookies makes over 60 varieties of cookies, including lines of creme wafers, sugar free and seasonal products. The Burlington plant remains the sole production facility, where over 200 full-time workers are employed.  Voortman's cookies are distributed throughout North America by a network of over 500 independent distributors. In 2015, Voortman's sales were over $100 million.

In 2015, a majority stake in Voortman Cookies was acquired by private equity firm Swander Pace Capital. At that time, Chief Executive Officer Harry Voortman stepped away from daily management but remains on the board of directors.

In 2017, Voortman went through a complete rebranding, which included removal from its formulas of all artificial colors, artificial flavours, and high-fructose corn syrup.

On December 2, 2019, Hostess Brands announced that it was purchasing Voortman from Swander Pace Capital for approximately US$320 million (C$425 million). The transaction was completed in January 2020.

Trans fat ban 
In 2003, Voortman Cookies announced that no trans fats would be used in the production of its cookies. This made Voortman Cookies the first Canadian food company and one of the first in North America to abolish the use of trans-fats in retail food products.

References

External links 
 

1951 establishments in Ontario
Confectionery companies
Canadian subsidiaries of foreign companies
Companies based in Burlington, Ontario
Canadian companies established in 1951
Food and drink companies of Canada
Food and drink companies established in 1951
Brand name cookies
Dutch-Canadian culture
2020 mergers and acquisitions